Braginsky, sometimes spelled Braginskiy, or Braginskaya (feminine; Брагинская) is a Slavic surname. Notable people with the surname include:

Alexander Braginsky (born 1944), Russian pianist
Emil Braginsky (1921–1998), Russian writer and actor
Iosif Braginsky (1905–1989), a Soviet orientalist
Ivan Braginsky, (Also spelled as Braginski), the human name chosen for the personification of Russia from the anime series Axis Powers Hetalia
Rene Braginsky, a notable Swiss collector of Jewish Manuscripts and Artwork
Stanislav I. Braginsky, research geophysicist
Vladimir Braginsky, a Russian physicist
Colin Braginsky is a Swiss long-distance runner (5 km - half marathon) who won the bronze medal at the Maccabiah Games 2015 in Berlin for his half marathon. In 2017, he also won a bronze medal at the Maccabiah Games 2017 in Jerusalem together with an international in a 4*100m mixed relay. In 2019 he won the gold medal of his age category in half marathon at the Maccabiah Games in Budapest. Braginsky played football for over 20 years as defender of FC JTV Basel, a football club in Basel.

Russian-language surnames